A floating restaurant is a vessel, usually a large steel barge or hulk, used as a restaurant on water. The Jumbo Kingdom, formerly located at Aberdeen in Hong Kong,  was at one time the world's largest floating restaurant, until it sank at sea in 2022. Sometimes retired ships are given a second lease on life as floating restaurants. The former car ferry New York, built in 1941, serves as DiMillo's in Portland, Maine. Another example is the train ferry , which served as a restaurant in Detroit. Plans for Lansdowne to continue in this capacity on the Buffalo, New York waterfront came to naught and it was scrapped in the summer of 2008. A third example of a ship's hull converted for this purpose is Captain John's Harbour Boat Restaurant in Toronto, which was located on MS Jadran, a former Yugoslavian ship but has since been closed and scrapped. Normac, the first Captain John's restaurant, was moved to Port Dahousie as the floating cocktail lounge Big Kahuna and is now the Riverboat Mexican Grill.

Examples
  - defunct
 Captain John's Harbour Boat Restaurant (MS Jadran) - defunct
 Jumbo Kingdom - sank at sea in 2022
 MV Ganga Vihar
  - defunct
 McBarge
 Moshulu
  (the original Captain John's restaurant in Toronto, now the Riverboat Mexican Grill in Port Dalhousie, Ontario)
 
 Rustar dhow
 Sherman - defunct
 
 Star Seafood Floating Restaurant
 
 
 , on the Aura River at Turku in Finland using the 1869-built Swedish steamship Fredriksborg
 M/B Camaligan
 Shun Kee Typhoon Shelter Seafood in New Causeway Bay Typhoon Shelter, Victoria City

See also 
 Revolving restaurant
 Houseboat
 Kettuvallam - a type of houseboat in Kerala, India, many of which serve as hotels for tourists with cooking on board

References

External links 
 

 
Restaurant
Restaurants by type
Restaurant
Theme restaurants